Neerum Neruppum is a 1971 Indian Tamil-language swashbuckler film directed by P. Neelakantan, starring M. G. Ramachandran and Jayalalithaa, with R. S. Manohar, Thengai Srinivasan among others. The storyline is based on the 1844 French novella The Corsican Brothers by Alexandre Dumas. The film was remade in Hindi as Gora Aur Kala.

Plot 
The story is about twin princes Manivannan and Karikalan who seek to avenge their father's death at hands of King Marthandan. The twins are separated. But Karikalan can feel whatever feelings Manivannan is in. Karikalan wanted to avenge those people who have set fire to his castle. One of them is brought up by Arunakiri while the other is brought up by Marudhu. One is educated preferring to use brains over brawns while the other is an adept fighter. They both plan and execute the downfall of Marthandan.

Cast 

The casting is established according to the original order of the credits of opening of the movie, except those not mentioned.

Soundtrack

Production 
The film was prominently shot at Gemini Studios. K. P. Ramakrishnan served as a stunt double for Ramachandran.

References

External links 

1970s Tamil-language films
1971 films
Films based on The Corsican Brothers
Films directed by P. Neelakantan
Films scored by M. S. Viswanathan
Twins in Indian films
Indian swashbuckler films